Ronald Lyman Fair (October 27, 1932 – February 2018) was an American writer and sculptor. He was known for his experimental and versatile literary forms, most prominently through the 1966 novel Hog Butcher, set in 1960s Chicago. This was the basis of the 1975 film Cornbread, Earl and Me. The cast included Rosalind Cash and Laurence Fishburne.  Relocating to Finland, Fair began sculpting in 1977. In December 1980 he became "born again", thereafter becoming a "Christian writer" and founder of the International Orphans' Assistance Association.

Biography
Ronald Fair was born in 1932 to Mississippi farmworkers Herbert and Beulah Hunt Fair in Chicago, Illinois, where he went to school. After serving three years in the US Navy, he attended the Stenotype School of Chicago, after which he found employment as a court reporter for 12 years. Having begun writing in his teens, he published various pieces in publications including the Chicago Defender, Ebony, Chat Noir, before the publication in 1965 of his first novel, Many Thousand Gone: An American Fable. His second novel, Hog Butcher, was filmed in 1975 as Cornbread, Earl and Me. In 1970, he published World of Nothing: Two Novellas, and 1972 the autobiographical novel We Can't Breathe.

In 1977, Fair moved to Finland, where he dedicated himself more to sculpture than writing. In Finland, he lived in Helsinki, Tampere and Kerimäki.

He died in Finland in February 2014, aged 85.

Publications 
 Many Thousand Gone: An American Fable (short novel), Harcourt, 1965.
 Hog Butcher (novel), Harcourt, 1966; republished as Cornbread, Earl and Me, Bantam, 1975.
 World of Nothing: Two Novellas, Harper, 1970.
 We Can't Breathe (novel), Harper, 1972.
 Excerpts (poetry), Paul Breman, 1975.
 Rufus (poetry), P. Schlack (Germany), 1977; 2nd edn Lotus Press, 1980

Norwegian 
1987: Eva; Rex Forlag

Swedish 
1978: "Gudskelov För snön" ("Thank God It Snowed"); 6/78 Bonniers Litterära Magasin (BLM), December 1978; Arg. 47 Nr 6.

Portuguese 
2002: Correndo Para A Vida (1st printing), Brazil
2010: Correndo Para A Vida (2nd printing), Finland

Spanish
 2010: Corriendo Hacia La Vida (1st printing) Finland

Lyrics for recordings 
1980: "A New Kinda Day"; Frendz, Music, H. Silvenoinen; Lyrics, Ronald Fair
1980: "Final Awakening"; Frendz, Music, H. Silvenoinen; Lyrics, Ronald Fair
1980: "Dancing People";  Frendz, Music, H. Silvenoinen; Lyrics, Ronald Fair

Movies 
1968: An American Hero, film script for Dino De Laurentiis, Hollywood
1971: Hog Butcher, two drafts.  Producer had two heart attacks and sold the rights to someone else
1975: Cornbread, Earl & Me, from Hog Butcher
1994: Kirje Suomesta, music video, directed by R. Ampuja
1995: Who Is Your Neighbour, Mumbai (Bombay), India; P. K. Rajhuns Director. Written and co-produced
2000: The Truth by P. K. Rajhuns; co-produced

Play performances 
1968: The Emperor's Parade, or, Our Boy Dick; A Political Satire (Chicago)
1968 & 1969: Sails and Sinkers; comedy (Chicago; Middletown, Conn Weslayan University)
1988: Animal Christmas, a musical (Helsinki)
2002: Animal Christmas, Jyväskylä, Finland
2003: Animal Christmas, Kankaanpää, Finland
2008: Animal Christmas; Hyderabad, India
2009: Animal Christmas; Hyderabad, India

Sculpture

References

External links
 "Growing Up Black and Female, Black and Male in Chicago in Gwendolyn Brooks's Maud Martha and Ron Fair's Hog Butcher", in Illinois History Teacher (Volume 3:2, 1996) at Illinois Periodicals Online, Northern Illinois University Libraries
 
 Archive listing of Ronald Fair Collection, Northwestern University Library
 "We Can’t Breathe. Part One of Ronald L. Fair's prescient, 1972 autobiographical novel", The Common Reader, September 29, 2020.

1932 births
2018 deaths
20th-century African-American writers
20th-century American male writers
20th-century American non-fiction writers
20th-century American novelists
20th-century American poets
21st-century African-American people
African-American film directors
African-American male writers
African-American novelists
African-American poets
American Christian writers
American expatriates in Finland
American male non-fiction writers
American male novelists
American male poets
Artists from Chicago